Here is the roster of everyone who has played on the Rochester Knighthawks of the National Lacrosse League, or who was placed just on the practice squad, including the player's number, position, nationality, and years with the team.

	2002-08
	2005-07
	1997
	1995-97
	1996
	1996-99
	1997-03
	2006-08
	2002-03
	2006
	1995
	1997
	2002-05
	2001-02
	1999
	1999
	2006-08
	1995
	1996
	1996
	2001
	1996, 1998-08
	1998
	2000-01
	2005-07
	2006-08
	1998-99
	1995-01
	2006-08
	1998-99
	1995–99, 2010–11
	2005-07
	1995-98
	2004-08
	2006-08
	1996-97
	1998-99
	2007-08
	1995-97
	1996-99
	1998
	2004-05
	2000-08
	2006-08
	2004
	1999-07
	1995
	1995
	2004-08
	1995-04
	2000-02
	1995-02
	2002-03
	2003-04
	2004-05

	1996
	1999
	1998-01
	1995-96
	2005-06
	1997
	2008
	1995-96
	1999-01
	2008
	1998-03
	2002-04
	1997-01
	1995
	1995-01
	2005-08
	2006
	2007
	2001
	2000
	2004-06
	1999-08
	1995-96
	2003-06
	2008
	1999-00
	1997
	2007-08
	1995-98
	2004
	1998-99
	1998-99
	1997
	2002-08
	1998-99	
	1995-96
	1995-05
	1995
	2004
	2004
	2002-03
	1995
	2002
	2004
	1997-00
	1995-08
	2005-08
	2000-05
 2008
	2003
	2007-08
	1998
 2003, 2007–08
	2002-08
	2000-05
	2009-11

Practice squad

	2004	
	2003
	2004	
	2004
	2003	
	2002	
	2008
	2001-02	
	1995	
	2001
	2001	
	2005
	1997		

	2002	
	2005	
	2000-01
	2005		
	1999
	2003	
	2007
	2008
 2008
	2006
	2006	
	2001	
	2001-02	

Lists of lacrosse players